Before the Devil Knows You're Dead is a 2007 American crime thriller film directed by Sidney Lumet. The film was written by Kelly Masterson, and stars Philip Seymour Hoffman, Ethan Hawke, Marisa Tomei, and Albert Finney. The title comes from the Irish saying: "May you be in heaven a full half-hour before the devil knows you're dead". The film unfolds in a nonlinear narrative, repeatedly going back and forth in time, with some scenes shown repeatedly from differing points of view. It was the last film directed by Lumet before his death in 2011.

The film appeared on 21 critics' end-of-the-year top ten lists indexed by Metacritic and was selected as one of 2007's ten most influential American films by the American Film Institute, at the 2007 AFI Awards.

Plot
Note: The story is explained here in its chronological order, rather than as it is presented in the film.

Facing an upcoming audit that will reveal his embezzlement, finance executive Andy Hanson decides to escape to Brazil. To raise the necessary funds, he enlists the aid of his brother, Hank, a divorced father who needs money to pay child support and tuition. Hank has been having an affair with Andy's wife, Gina.

Hank is well-meaning but easily dominated by Andy, a ruthless schemer. Andy, in turn, resents his younger and more attractive brother, whom their parents favored. Andy plans to rob their parents' jewelry store, to which Hank reluctantly agrees. Andy argues that he cannot go himself because he has been seen in the neighborhood recently. They assume that only Doris, an elderly employee, will be there, necessitating only a toy gun, and ensuring that insurance will make it a victimless crime. Andy plans to fence the jewelry via a New York City dealer his father knows, and expects to net about $120,000 from the robbery.

Without consulting Andy, Hank hires Bobby Lasorda, an acquaintance who is an experienced thief, to help him. Bobby reveals a real gun and commits the robbery himself while Hank waits in the car. The brothers' mother Nanette happens to be filling in for Doris, and while Bobby is distracted, Nanette grabs a hidden pistol and shoots him; he shoots her back, mortally wounding her, before she kills him with a second shot. She dies a week later in the hospital. Unsatisfied with the police investigation, her husband Charles becomes obsessed with finding information about the crime. Shortly after the botched robbery, Bobby's brother-in-law Dex confronts Hank and demands financial compensation for Bobby's widow, Chris, threatening to either turn him over to the police or kill him if he does not come up with the money.

While Andy is away from his office, his superiors repeatedly try to contact him regarding irregularities revealed by the audit. At Nanette's wake, Andy and Charles have a complex and emotional exchange. Charles states he loves Andy despite their long-standing differences. Andy, who feels like an outsider, questions his biological heritage, and Charles slaps him. Andy and Gina immediately leave. On their drive home, Andy has an emotional breakdown over his relationship with his father. At home, Gina tells Andy his boss has been trying to contact him. She expresses her frustration with their marriage and Andy's growing coldness. Andy, preoccupied with his problems, hardly reacts when Gina announces she is leaving him or even when she reveals her affair with Hank, and instead he gives her money for her departure when she asks for some.

Charles, searching for information about the robbery, visits the same fence Andy contacted. After an acrimonious exchange indicating a longstanding, mutual dislike, the jeweler reveals that Andy recently came looking to fence some jewels. Charles immediately goes looking for Andy. Andy decides to resolve Hank's blackmail situation by robbing a heroin dealer whom he frequents and then escaping abroad.

At the dealer's apartment, Andy and Hank overpower and rob the dealer. Hank is shocked when Andy kills the dealer and a client who happened to be present. The brothers meet Dex to pay him off, but Andy impulsively kills him to prevent continued blackmail. Andy appears ready to kill Chris, but Hank objects after hearing Chris' baby crying in another room. Andy turns the gun on Hank, revealing that he knows about Hank and Gina's relationship. Hank begs Andy to kill him. As Andy pauses, Chris shoots Andy in the back with Dex's gun. Horrified, she orders Hank to leave, and he guiltily leaves some of the money behind for her before fleeing.

After leaving the fence, Charles tails Andy. He follows Andy from his apartment tower, watches as he goes to Hank's apartment, then follows his sons to their meeting with Chris; Charles sees Hank fleeing the apartment and calls out to him, but Hank continues running, and escapes. He finally follows Andy to the hospital, where he is taken by paramedics. Andy breaks down and apologizes to his estranged father. Charles appears to accept his apology. Charles attaches Andy's heart monitor to himself and suffocates his son to death with a pillow. As medical staff rush to help Andy, Charles walks away.

Cast

Production
After experimenting with the format of high definition video on the television series 100 Centre Street, Lumet made the decision to shoot Before the Devil Knows You're Dead on the Panavision Genesis digital camera system. At a press conference at the 2007 New York Film Festival, Lumet called shooting on film "a pain in the ass," and predicted that as soon as distributors and exhibitors could agree on a digital projection format, photographic film would be rendered obsolete.

The primary robbery scene was filmed at the Bay Terrace Shopping Center in Bayside, Queens, New York.

Sidney Lumet knew Philip Seymour Hoffman was going to have more difficulty with the opening sex scene than Marisa Tomei. "I don't think Philip has ever conceived of himself in the nude fucking onscreen. It's just not something that comes his way. So when we started blocking, Marisa hopped up on the bed, got on her hands and knees, slapped her ass and said, 'Come on Philly, let's go!' I could kiss her. Because if Philip had any inhibitions, they were gone," Lumet said.

Release
The film premiered on September 6, 2007, at the Festival of American Cinema in Deauville, France. It was also shown at the Toronto International Film Festival in Canada on September 13, 2007. It opened in France on September 26, 2007. The film made its American debut on October 12, 2007, at the New York Film Festival. It opened in limited release in the United States on October 26, 2007, in two theaters, grossing US$73,837 in its opening weekend. In total, the film grossed over US$25 million worldwide.

Reception
Rotten Tomatoes, a review aggregator, reports that 88% of 180 surveyed critics gave the film a positive review; the average rating is 7.7/10. The website’s critical consensus reads: "A tense and effective thriller, Before the Devil Knows You're Dead marks a triumphant return to form for director Sidney Lumet." On Metacritic, the film has a weighted average score of 85 out of 100, based on 37 critics, indicating "universal acclaim".

Time magazine's Richard Schickel named the movie one of the top 10 films of 2007, ranking it at #3, saying, "At one level the movie is a wonderfully intricate exploration of family dysfunction. At another, it's a coolly controlled examination of increasingly insane criminal ineptitude. Either way you look at it, this is a hypnotizing film from one of our great masters." Roger Ebert gave the film four out of four stars, calling it "superb" and its director, Sidney Lumet, a "living treasure."

Top 10 lists
The film appeared on many critics' top 10 lists of the best films of 2007.

1st - Stephen Farber, The Hollywood Reporter
1st - Steven Rea, The Philadelphia Inquirer
2nd - Marc Mohan, The Oregonian
2nd - Owen Gleiberman, Entertainment Weekly
3rd - Manohla Dargis, The New York Times
3rd - Richard Schickel, Time
3rd - Roger Ebert, Chicago Sun-Times
4th - Rene Rodriguez, The Miami Herald
5th - Marc Savlov, The Austin Chronicle
6th - Carina Chocano, Los Angeles Times
6th - Frank Scheck, The Hollywood Reporter
6th - Keith Phipps, The A.V. Club
7th - Scott Foundas, LA Weekly (tied with Eastern Promises)
8th - Jack Mathews, New York Daily News
8th - Lou Lumenick, New York Post
8th - Peter Travers, Rolling Stone
8th - Ty Burr, The Boston Globe
9th - Mick LaSalle, San Francisco Chronicle
9th - Peter Vonder Haar, Film Threat
10th - Philip Martin, Arkansas Democrat-Gazette
10th - Stephen Hunter, The Washington Post

Awards and honors
American Film Institute Awards 2007
Boston Society of Film Critics Award for Best Cast
Gotham Independent Film Award for Best Ensemble Cast
Satellite Award for Best Cast – Motion Picture

Home media
The film was released on DVD and Blu-ray on April 15, 2008.

References

External links
 
 
 
 
 
 Interview with director Sidney Lumet, actors Philip Seymour Hoffman & Ethan Hawke on The Charlie Rose Show

2000s American films
2000s English-language films
2000s heist films
2007 crime drama films
2007 crime thriller films
2007 thriller drama films
American crime drama films
American crime thriller films
American heist films
American neo-noir films
American nonlinear narrative films
Films set in New York City
Films shot in New York City
Filicide in fiction
Films about adultery in the United States
Films about drugs
Films about heroin addiction
Films about the illegal drug trade
Films about murder
Films directed by Sidney Lumet
Films scored by Carter Burwell
Films set in the 2000s